Beezen may be,

Beezen language
Beez von Beezen